
Year 84 BC was a year of the pre-Julian Roman calendar. At the time it was known as the Year of the Consulship of Carbo and Cinna (or, less frequently, year 670 Ab urbe condita). The denomination 84 BC for this year has been used since the early medieval period, when the Anno Domini calendar era became the prevalent method in Europe for naming years.

Events 
 By place 
 Asia 
 Battle of Cana: The Arab Nabataean Kingdom decisively defeats the Greek Seleucid Empire, slaying King Antiochus XII Dionysus, at modern-day Umm Qais in Jordan.

 Roman Republic 
 The First Mithridatic War comes to an end.

Births 
 Catullus, Roman poet (approximate date) (d. c. 54 BC)
 Servilius Casca, Roman politician (d. c. 42 BC)
 Surena, Parthian general (d. 53 BC)

Deaths 
 Apellicon of Teos, Greek book collector (approximate date)
 Gaius Flavius Fimbria, Roman politician and general
 Lucius Cornelius Cinna, Roman consul (killed by mutinying troops)

References